James Efmorfidis (born 18 January 1996) is a Greek former professional footballer who played as an attacking midfielder.

Career
Efmorfidis played in the youth academies of Enosi Erythreas, Ajax, Real Madrid, AEK Athens, Barcelona and again Ajax. In 2015, he joined AZ, where he mainly played in the reserve team, Jong AZ. He was once on the bench with AZ's first team, in the 3–0 away loss to PSV. With Jong AZ, he became champion of the Tweede Divisie in the 2016–17 season, but Efmorfidis left halfway through the season for the Greek club Larissa. There, he made two appearances in the Super League Greece, but he soon returned to The Netherlands. He briefly joined practice at Hoofdklasse club SDO Bussum, and when SDO head coach Ivar van Dinteren combined the position with coaching at Jong Almere City, the reserve team of Almere City, Efmorfidis followed him. In the 2017–18 season, he played for Jong Almere City in the Derde Divisie Saturday. In January 2018, Efmorfidis signed a permanent contract with Almere City FC until 2020. When the contract expired, he moved to Eredivisie club RKC Waalwijk. On 3 August 2021, he announced his retirement from professional football.

Career statistics

References

External links

totaldutchfootball.com
arenalarissa.gr
sportlarissa.gr
 

1996 births
Living people
Footballers from Athens
Greek footballers
Greece youth international footballers
Association football midfielders
Athlitiki Enosi Larissa F.C. players
Almere City FC players
RKC Waalwijk players
Eredivisie players
Eerste Divisie players
Tweede Divisie players
Derde Divisie players
AFC Ajax players
Real Madrid CF players
FC Barcelona players
AEK Athens F.C. players
AZ Alkmaar players
Jong AZ players
Greek expatriate footballers
Expatriate footballers in the Netherlands
Super League Greece players
Greek expatriate sportspeople in the Netherlands
SDO Bussum players